John Reynold (fl. 1539) was an English politician.

He was a Member (MP) of the Parliament of England for Bath in 1539. He has not been further identified.

References

Year of birth missing
Year of death missing
English MPs 1539–1540